Trezelle Samuel Jenkins (born March 13, 1973) is a former American football player.  He played college football as an offensive tackle for the University of Michigan from 1991 to 1994. His nickname at U of M was "house cat" given to him by his teammates. After being drafted in the first round of the 1995 NFL Draft, he played professional football in the National Football League (NFL) for the Kansas City Chiefs from 1995 to 1997.

Early years
Jenkins was born in Chicago, Illinois, in 1973.  He attended, and played football at, Morgan Park High School in Chicago.

University of Michigan 
Jenkins enrolled at the University of Michigan in 1991 and played college football for head coach Gary Moeller's Michigan Wolverines football teams from 1991 to 1994.

As a sophomore in 1992, Jenkins started nine games at left offensive tackle for the undefeated 1992 Michigan Wolverines football team that compiled a 9-0-3 record and defeated Washington in the 1993 Rose Bowl. As a junior, he started seven games (two at left tackle and five at right tackle), and as a senior, he started all 12 games at left tackle.

Professional football 
Jenkins was selected by the Kansas City Chiefs in the first round (31st overall pick) of the 1995 NFL Draft. He was the first offensive lineman the Chiefs selected in the first round since Brian Jozwiak in 1986.

Jenkins played in only nine games for the Chiefs from 1995 to 1997. He was subsequently signed by the New Orleans Saints and the Minnesota Vikings but never appeared in a game for either team.

In 2000, Jenkins was drafted 156th overall by the San Francisco Demons of the XFL but failed to make the team.

In 2007, Charles Robinson, of Yahoo! Sports ranked Jenkins as the worst No. 31 pick since the AFL-NFL merger.

Harold's Chicken Shack 
In 1999, Jenkins and his wife, Dora, opened a franchise of Chicago's Harold's Chicken Shack  in Ferndale, Michigan on 8 Mile Road, made famous by Detroit rapper Eminem.

References 

1973 births
Living people
American football offensive tackles
Michigan Wolverines football players
Players of American football from Chicago
Kansas City Chiefs players
Place of birth missing (living people)